Quedlinburg was a district (Kreis) in the west of Saxony-Anhalt, Germany. Neighboring districts are (from west clockwise) Wernigerode, Halberstadt, Bördekreis, Aschersleben-Staßfurt, Mansfelder Land, Sangerhausen and the district Nordhausen in Thuringia.

History 
In 1950, the district of Ballenstedt was added to the district.  Parts of the districts of Blankenburg and of Aschersleben were added in 1994.

On July 1, 2007, the district of Quedlinburg was merged, with the districts of Halberstadt and of Wernigerode, into the new district of Harz.

Geography 
The northern part of the district is located in the Harz mountains.

Coat of arms

Towns and municipalities

External links 
 Regional portal site (German)
 Touristic website (German, English)

Districts of Prussia